Anadia may refer to:

Places
Anadia, Alagoas, a municipality in the State of Alagoas, Brazil
Anadia, Portugal, a town and municipality in the district of Aveiro, Portugal

Other
 Anadia (lizard), a genus of lizards
 Anadia FC, a Portuguese Football Club